Hellenic Seaways is member of Attica Group, which is engaged in passenger shipping through SUPERFAST FERRIES, BLUE STAR FERRIES, HELLENIC SEAWAYS and AFRICA MOROCCO LINK operating 35 vessels providing modern, high-quality transportation services in Greece and abroad. Attica’s vessels serve 60 unique destinations in 4 countries, connecting 71 ports transporting over 7 million passengers, 1 million passenger vehicles and 400,000 trucks every year.

History
Hellenic Seaways was created in 2005 following the consolidation of Minoan Flying Dolphins and its subsidiaries Hellas Flying Dolphins, Hellas Ferries, Saronikos Ferries and Sporades Ferries.

It is the biggest Greek shipping Company, which operates  21 vessels, 9 conventional, and 12 high-speed, servicing more than 35 ports in the Cyclades, North East Aegean, South East Aegean, Crete, Argosaronikos and Sporades.

In August 2009 Hellenic Seaways purchased the single-ship, budget cruise line easyCruise from founder Stelios Haji-Ioannou.

In January 2011 Minoan Lines (Heraklion) cancelled the sale of its 33,35% stake in Hellenic Seaways to ANEK and try to find a new buyer for it.

In June 2018 Minoan Lines (Heraklion) sold its 48.53% stake in Hellenic Seaways to Attica Group for 78.5 million euros.

Fleet

Hellenic Seaways operate a large fleet of high speed craft, conventional ferries

Conventional Ferries

Highspeed

AERO Highspeed

Flying Cat

Flying Dolphin

Current Routes

Cyclades

 Piraeus - Paros - Naxos - Koufonisi- Amorgos (Highspeed 4)
 Rafina - Tinos - Mykonos - Naxos (Flying Cat 3)
Lavrio - Kea - Kythnos - Andros - Tinos - Syros - Paros - Naxos - Ios - Sikinos - Folegandros - Kimolos - Milos - Kimolos - Sifnos - Serifos (Artemis)

North Aegean & Dodecanese

Piraeus - Chios - Mytilene  (Nissos Samos & Nissos Rodos) 
Piraeus - Santorini - Vathy - Kos - Symi - Rhodes (Ariadne) 

Argosaronikos

Piraeus - Aegina - Agistri  (Flying Dolphin XIX, Aero 1, Aero 2, Aero 3)
Piraeus - Poros - Hydra - Ermioni - Spetses - Porto Heli, Flyingcat 4, Flyingcat 5, Flying Cat 6 Aero 1, Aero 2, Aero 3)

Sporades

Volos - Skiathos - Glossa - Skopelos - Alonissos (Express Skiathos)

Destinations

Terminated Destinations
Heraklion
Chania
Rethymno
Amorgos
Irakleia
Schoinousa
Kos
Rhodes
Agios Konstantinos
Methana
Thessaloniki

Terminated Routes
Hellenic Seaways covered itineraries to Chania in Crete island in the summer periods from 2004-2006 with the highspeed vessel Highspeed 4 in 4 hours and 30 minutes, and in summer 2007 with the passenger ferry Ariadne" The company also launched routes from Piraeus to Rethymno port, in Crete with Highspeed 5"in summer 2008. In the summer season of 2010 Hellenic Seaways launched for the first time itineraries from Piraeus to Dodecanese islands, Kos and Rhodes, (through Paros) with the passenger ferry Nissos Rodos but after an unsuccessful period they were cancelled.

Until early summer 2018, Hellenic Seaways sailed from Heraklion in Crete to Mykonos with calls at the ports of Santorini, Ios and Paros with the Highspeed 7. Then, Hellenic Seaways withdrew from the route, due to the Highspeed 7 being transferred to Minoan Lines as part of the deal for the sale of Minoan's stake in Hellenic Seaways to Attica Group. The vessel, however, remained in the route under the flag of its new owner and the new name Santorini Palace.

Saronikos Joint Venture
In late 2013 Hellenic Seaways formed a joint venture with Saronic Gulf rivals Nova Ferries and 2way Ferries. Created to offer better schedules and better prices for the consumers, the joint venture marketed as Saronic Ferries, using four vessels and covering a total of four destinations. After selling the ferries Posidon Hellas and Apollon Hellas to 2way Ferries in 2015 and 2016 respectively, Hellenic Seaways left the joint venture.

Awards
In 2007 Hellenic Seaways was awarded by "Lloyd's List Greek Shipping Awards" as "The Best Passenger Line of the Year 2007" and their, then new-building vessel, Nissos Chios, was awarded with the prize of "The Best Ship of the Year 2007". Her sister ship, the Nissos Mykonos, had also won the same award in 2006. In 2014 Hellenic Seaways was again awarded by "Lloyd's List Greek Shipping Awards" as "The Best Passenger Line of the Year 2014".

Former ships

The following list includes former ships of the current company and of predecessors Minoan Flying Dolphins (MFD) and its subsidiaries.

References

External links
 Hellenic Seaways
Hellenic Seaways' ships videos
 greece island hopping

Transport companies established in 2005
Ferry companies of Greece
Shipping companies of Greece
Companies based in Athens